Kukerpillid is an Estonian folk music ensemble established in 1972.

Discography
 Rahvalikke laule, 1976 (EP)
 Kukerpillid Kanadas, 1976
 Ansambel "Kukerpillid" (1980), 1980
 10 aastat Kukerpille, 1982
 Ansambel "Kukerpillid" (1987), 1987
 15 aastat sõprade seltsis 1987
 Merel sündinud, 1988
 YLEN Kansanmusiikkia, 1990
 Simmaniduo & Kukerpillid 1992
 20 aastat, 1992
 Kukerpillid, 1994
 Kui tore on see, 1996
 Veel kord CD1, CD2; 1997
 Tahan lennata, 1998
 Pojad on mul õige naksid CD1, CD2; 2002
 Eesti lastelaulud, 2003
 Šoti laulud Šoti klubis, 2003
 Meren juhlaa – Mere pidu, 2006
 Kukerpillid: 72 parimat laulu CD1, CD2, CD3; 2007

References

External links

 

Estonian folk music groups
1972 establishments in Estonia